The Albatros D.IV was an experimental German fighter aircraft built and tested during World War I.

Design and development
The D.IV was designed to test a geared version of the 120 kW (160 hp) Mercedes D.III engine. Unlike the ungeared version, the geared engine was completely enclosed within the fuselage. The airframe basically combined the D.II wing cellule with the D.Va fuselage along with minor alterations to the rudder balance and the horizontal stabilizer.

Three examples were ordered in November 1916, but only one was flown, which was tested with several types of propeller, but excessive vibration problems and limited performance increase precluded further development.

Specifications

See also

Notes

References

 Grosz, Peter M. "The Agile & Aggressive Albatros". Air Enthusiast Quarterly, No. 1, n.d., pp. 36–51.  

1910s German fighter aircraft
Military aircraft of World War I
D.04
Abandoned military aircraft projects of Germany
Single-engined tractor aircraft
Biplanes